Semele is an opera by John Eccles, written in about 1706 with a libretto by William Congreve drawing on the Semele myth from Ovid's Metamorphoses. It forms part of the English opera tradition of Blow's Venus and Adonis, but was never staged due to changes in popular taste at the time. Indeed, the opera remained unperformed until the mid twentieth century, eclipsed by George Frideric Handel's 1744 secular oratorio of the same name, based on the same libretto.

Roles

Argument

In his introductory 'argument', Congreve briefly summarises the plot, explains why he has modified some of Ovid's story, and then goes on to explain for the audience's benefit the concept of musical recitative:

Synopsis

Act I
Semele is about to be married against her will to Prince Athamus, though she loves the god Jupiter. Jupiter's thunder interrupts the ceremony, and Athamus finds himself left alone with Ino, Semele's sister. Ino is professing her love for Athamus when Cadmus enters to announce that Semele has been carried off to heaven by Jupiter in the form of an eagle.

Act 2
Juno, jealous wife of Jupiter, has instructed her handmaid Iris to find out where Semele and her husband are. Iris says that they are in his palace, guarded by dragons. Within the palace, Jupiter and Semele sing of their mutual love but Semele is not satisfied, realising that as a mortal her happiness must be transitory. Jupiter attempts to divert her from such thoughts, and to provide entertainment arranges for Ino to visit her.

Act 3
Juno, accompanied by Iris, visit the god Somnus and asks to borrow his magic rod to charm the dragons. She gets Somnus to put Ino to sleep so that she can take her place. Disguised as Ino, Juno falsely tells Semele that she has the opportunity to become immortal if only she can persuade Jupiter to appear before her as he really is, in his natural godly state. When Semele and Jupiter are alone, Semele first secures from him a vow that he will do whatever she asks, and then she demands that he appear as a god. Jupiter warns her of her folly but is unable to persuade her to change her mind. He carries out the vow, appearing with his most gentle fire and lightning, but is unable to save her from being destroyed. In the final scene, Ino marries Athamus and Apollo prophesies that Bacchus, the unborn child of Jupiter and Semele, will rise from Semele's ashes.

History

Eccles probably completed the score of Semele in late 1706, basing his music on a libretto of 1705–6 by his close friend William Congreve. The opera may been intended to open John Vanbrugh's new Queen's Theatre in The Haymarket in 1707, but that became impossible when the Lord Chancellor gave Vanbrugh's competitor Christopher Rich at the Theatre Royal, Drury Lane a monopoly on opera productions in London. Congreve and Eccles were forced to agree to a production at Drury Lane, but Rich never brought it to the stage. Congreve published his libretto in 1710, but Eccles's music remained unheard, with popular fashion turning towards the Italianate style of opera seria. Congreve's libretto was later re-used, in slightly amended form, by George Frideric Handel for his secular oratorio Semele.

Eccles' Semele forms part of the English opera tradition that had begun with Blow's Venus and Adonis (c1683) and included Purcell's Dido and Aeneas (c. 1685–9). The non-performance of the opera in 1707 confirmed the end of this short-lived tradition. According to the New Grove Dictionary of Opera, Semele was 'in every way superior' to the other operas that were being performed in London at the time. The lack of productions in later years is attributable to the fact that modern directors have found Handel's greater setting of the same libretto so easy to turn into an opera.

Performance

The earliest known productions of Eccles' music were:

 Oxford, Wadham College Music Society and Oxford University Opera Club, conducted by John Byrt, 19 August 1964.
 St John's, Smith Square, London, 22 April 1972.

On 26 November 2019 Cambridge Handel Opera Company, Academy of Ancient Music and Cambridge Early Music staged a concert performance in Trinity College, Cambridge, conducted by Julian Perkins.

Recording

There is a 2004 recording on CD by Florida State University Opera conducted by Anthony Rooley, and a 2019 recording (published in January 2021), by the Academy of Ancient Music in partnership with the Cambridge Handel Opera Company, directed by Julian Perkins.  CD: Academy of Ancient Music, Cat: AAM012

See also

 Sémélé, a 1709 opera by Marin Marais on the same theme but based on a different libretto.
 Semele, a 1743 opera by Handel, based on the same libretto.

References

External links
Congreve's libretto for Semele as published in 1710, hosted by Renascence Editions
"Dramatic Themes in John Eccles's 1707 Setting of William Congreve's Semele" by Robert Kelley (PDF)
Synopsis and history of Semele from the Juilliard School

1706 operas
English-language operas
Operas by John Eccles
Operas
Operas based on classical mythology
Operas based on Metamorphoses